Kidane-Mariam Teklehaimanot (10 September 1933, Alitena - 2 June 2009) was a bishop of the  Ethiopian Catholic Church. He served as the Eparch of  Adigrat, in the northern Tigray Region, from his consecration on 12 October 1984, until his retirement on 16 November 2001. He was succeeded by Tesfasellassie Medhin.

Teklehaimanot held the title of Eparch Emeritus until his death on 2 June 2009, at the age of 75.

References
Catholic Hierarchy: Bishop Kidane-Mariam Teklehaimanot †

1933 births
2009 deaths
People from Tigray Region
Ethiopian Catholic bishops